Thomas Hauert (born 1967 in Schnottwil, Switzerland) is a Swiss dancer and choreographer, leader of the Brussels-based company ZOO/Thomas Hauert.

Biography
Born and raised in Switzerland, Thomas Hauert studied at the Rotterdam Dance Academy in the Netherlands. He moved to Brussels in 1991 to work in Anne Teresa De Keersmaeker’s company Rosas. He then collaborated with David Zambrano, Gonnie Heggen and Pierre Droulers. After the creation of the solo Hobokendans (1997), he founded his company ZOO with fellow dancers Mark Lorimer, Sarah Ludi, Mat Voorter and Samantha van Wissen. Their first performance, Cows in Space (1998), was awarded two prizes at the Rencontres chorégraphiques internationales de Seine-Saint-Denis.

The work of Hauert first developed from research on movement, with a particular interest in improvisation-based processes exploring the tension between freedom and constraint, individuals and the group, order and disorder, and form and formlessness. The relationship with music also plays a major part in his work. Since 1998, Hauert has created around 15 performances with his company ZOO. They were co-produced by European organizations such as Kaaitheater (Brussels), Kunstenfestivaldesarts (Brussels), Charleroi Danses, Centre Pompidou (Paris), Festival d'Automne à Paris, Théâtre de la Ville (Paris), Montpellier Danse, La Bâtie-Festival de Genève, Tanzquartier Wien (Vienna), Mercat de les Flors (Barcelona), Springdance (Utrecht) and PACT Zollverein (Essen). In addition to his work for ZOO, Hauert was commissioned to create pieces for external structures like P.A.R.T.S., the Trinity Laban Conservatoire of Music and Dance, the Zurich Ballet, Toronto Dance Theatre and Candoco. He participated in improvisation events like Movement Research Fall Festival 2008 and regularly improvises with musicians including Michel Debrulle, Chris Corsano and Barry Guy. In 2012, he was invited by IRCAM in Paris to lead a project on the relationship between improvised dance and electronic musical composition in the context of the festival-academy ManiFeste.

In 2010, the Belgian director Thierry De Mey created a film co-produced by European cultural television channel Arte, based on the ZOO’s work Accords.

Hauert has developed a teaching method from his choreographic practice. As a teacher, he has an ongoing collaboration with the P.A.R.T.S. academy in Brussels and regularly gives workshops worldwide. In 2012–13, he was the Valeska-Gert-guest professor for dance and performance at the Institute for Theater Studies of the Free University of Berlin.

Since 2012, he participates in the project “Motion Bank” initiated by The William Forsythe Company and the Ohio State University.

Thomas Hauert is resident artist at Charleroi Danses and associated artist at Kaaitheater Brussels.

Awards
 1998: winner Prix d’auteur and Prix Jan Fabre at the Rencontres chorégraphiques internationales de Seine-Saint-Denis for Cows in Space
 1998: winner Werkjahrespreis des Kantons Solothurn
 2005: winner Swiss Dance and Choreography Prize for modify
 2008: nominated for the Prix de la critique (Wallonie-Brussels) in the category Choreography for Accords
 2013: nominated for the Dora Awards, Toronto, in the category Outstanding Choreography for Pond Skaters (creation for Toronto Dance Theatre)
 2013: winner Current Dance Works Prize at the Swiss Dance Awards for From B to B
 2013: winner Dance Prize of the Canton of Solothurn
 2014: nominated for the Tribute to the Classical Arts Awards, New Orleans, in the category Outstanding Contemporary Dance Presentation for Like me more like me

Choreography for ZOO
 1998: Cows in Space
 1999: Pop-Up Songbook
 2000: Jetzt
 2001: Do You Believe in Gravity? Do You Trust the Pilot?
 2002: Verosimile
 2003: 5
 2004: modify
 2004: Drum & Dance
 2005: More or Less Sad Songs
 2006: Walking Oscar
 2006: Parallallemande
 2007: puzzled (created with Zefiro Torna)
 2008: Accords
 2009: Solo for EKL (in Korean Screens)
 2010: You've changed
 2011: From B to B (co-created with Ángels Margarit)
 2011: Like me more like me (co-created with Scott Heron)
 2012: Danse étoffée sur musique déguisée
 2013: MONO

Choreography for other organizations
 1991: Juppe (piece for 5 dancers created at the Rotterdam Academy in the context of the "Rotterdam in Beweging" festival)
 1996: solo for "Thé dansant" series at Plateau in Brussels
 1997: Hobokendans (for company Pierre Droulers)
 2000: Milky Way (for P.A.R.T.S)
 2002: Hà Mais (for Alma Txina, co-production ZOO)
 2004: Lobster Caravan (for P.A.R.T.S)
 2005: Fold & Twine (for The Trinity Laban Conservatoire of Music and Dance)
 2007: 12/8 (for P.A.R.T.S)
 2010: Il Giornale della necropoli (for the Zürcher Ballett)
 2010: Regarding the area between the inseparable (for P.A.R.T.S)
 2012: One moving as many moving as one (for the Free University of Berlin as part of the Valeska-Gert professorship for dance and performance)
 2013: Pond Skaters (for Toronto Dance Theatre)
 2014: Notturnino (for Candoco Dance Company)

Films
 2000: Space In (directed by Aliosha Van der Avoort)
 2010: La Valse (directed by Thierry De Mey)

References

 Rosita Boisseau, Panorama de la danse contemporaine, Ed. Textuel, 2006, p. 248–255
 Philippe Le Moal (red), Dictionnaire de la danse, Ed. Larousse, 2008
 biography on the website of VTI
 biography on the website of Swiss Arts Selection
 biography on the website of Alkantara festival
 Melissa Marotto, "Dance = Time + Space", Kaleidoscope, 2011
 Swiss Dance Awards website

Further reading 

 *

External links 

 website of ZOO/Thomas Hauert
 Thomas Hauert on the website of Charleroi Danses
 website of Motion Bank

Living people
People from the canton of Solothurn
Contemporary dance choreographers
Belgian choreographers
Belgian male dancers
1967 births
Codarts University for the Arts alumni